Lamp boxes are the smallest of the post boxes used by the Royal Mail in the UK, by its counterparts in the Commonwealth of Nations and also by An Post in Ireland. Their name derives from the fact that they were designed to be affixed to lamp posts, although they may equally be found embedded in walls or mounted on poles.

Lamp boxes were introduced on an experimental basis in September 1896, being used in parts of London as an inexpensive means of supplementing the existing Pillar box network. By July 1897 these boxes had proved successful and from then on their use spread to rural areas where the greater expense of a Ludlow style wall box was not justified.

The original pattern of lamp box was produced from 1896 to circa 1935.  During this time there were several variations of styles.

Reigns

Victoria

 LB201 - There are few survivors of this type, "Letters" above the aperture.
 LB202 - "Letters Only" was added around July 1897.

Although the lamp boxes were made by the same foundry as the Victorian ciphered pillar boxes, the ciphers differ slightly.  The V and R have equal length arms with an oval loop however, no curl on the toe.

Edward VII

 LB203 - EviiR Open cipher
 LB204 - EviiR Closed cipher, small tablet
 LB205 - EviiR closed cipher large tablet

Again two slightly different ciphers were used from those on the Pillar boxes.  With the introduction of the LB205 in 1905 came the larger tablet holder.  Prior to this all Lamp boxes used the smaller style tab.

George V

 LB206- Believed to be cast until about 1927, the original GR Lamp box had a crown above a small GR cipher.
 LB207-LB210 - The crown was removed and a larger GR cipher was used. While the box is 1/2 inch wider the aperture remains the same at 4¾ inches by 1 inch. Subtle differences in the makers name, cipher and door length distinguish between the different types.
 LB211 GvR 1935 Pattern -In response to criticism of the narrow aperture of the original Lamp box a larger model was cast with the aperture enlarged to 5½ inches by 1 inch.  This type of Lamp box was in use from 1935 to 1949 when it was replaced with the modern 1940s pattern.

George VI

 1936 LB212 The revised 1935 Pattern but carrying the cipher of George VI. As far as is known, no boxes were cast with the cipher of Edward VIII
 1940 LB213 Designed to be cheaper to make and of larger capacity, the 1940 Pattern was not actually put into production until 1949 due to restrictions on materials caused by World War II

Elizabeth II

 LB214 1952 LB214 was the first of around twenty variations in the earlier 1940 pattern box during the present reign.
 LB215 Allied Iron Founders
 LB216 Carron Company
 LB216 Carron Company Stirlingshire
 LB217 Carron Company Stirlingshire "1977 pattern"

In 1977, the design was changed so that the cast front was fitted to the galvanised steel back by four riveted lugs rather than 6 internal screws. These are henceforward known as "1977 Pattern". For the first three years the round-profile Collection Plate holder was retained. However, from 1980, they were always supplied with a Universal Collection Plate Holder (UCPH).

 LB 218 Carron Stirlingshire (No "Company" in the name)
 LB 219 Lion Foundry Kirkintilloch
 LB 220 Carronade
 LB 221 Machan Scotland
 LB 222 Abbott Engineering

In 1994, the letters business of the Post Office was split from the retail business. The former retained the title Royal Mail Letters whilst the later became Post Office Counters Ltd. This necessitated changing the castings yet again so that in future they would read Royal Mail rather than Post Office.

 LB223 Machan Scotland

The first new Lamp Letter box design for some years was introduced by Royal Mail in 1999. Designated Type N, or "The Bantam" box, the ultra-modern design is made in traditional cast iron, with polished steel fittings. These are more truly "pedestal boxes" such as Type L and Type M, but due to their size, are considered by the Letter Box Study Group to be Lamp Letter boxes.

 LB224 Type N Bantam box, Machan Engineering Scotland

All of the above Elizabeth II boxes can also be found with the Scottish crown. The new Bantam box is also made with a bi-lingual Welsh/English branding.

 LB3426 stainless steel boxes are produced by RM Manufacturing, Newcastle upon Tyne. (RM Manufacturing is part of Royal Mail Property and Facilities Solutions Ltd).

Other meanings
The term "lamp box" is also used to refer to a computer running the LAMP solution stack (Linux, Apache, MySQL and PHP), and generally used as a web server.

Images

See also 
Pillar box
Wall box
Ludlow style wall box
 2012 Olympics gold post boxes in the United Kingdom

References

External links

The Letter Box Study Group
Colne Valley Postal History Museum

Postal infrastructure
Street furniture
Postal history